Promising Young Woman is a 2020 thriller film written, co-produced, and directed by Emerald Fennell in her feature directorial debut. It stars Carey Mulligan as a troubled young woman haunted by a traumatic past as she navigates balancing forgiveness and vengeance, with Bo Burnham, Alison Brie, Clancy Brown, Chris Lowell, Jennifer Coolidge, Laverne Cox, and Connie Britton in supporting roles.

Promising Young Woman had its world premiere at the Sundance Film Festival on January 25, 2020, and was theatrically released in the United States on December 25, 2020, by Focus Features. It received positive reviews from critics, with praise for Fennell's direction and screenplay, the editing and Mulligan's performance, and grossed $19 million worldwide. The film won Best Original Screenplay at the 93rd Academy Awards, with additional nominations for Best Picture, Best Director, Best Actress (Mulligan), and Best Film Editing. Fennell also won Best Original Screenplay at the Critics' Choice Awards, Writers' Guild Awards, and British Academy Film Awards.

Plot

Cassie Thomas, a 30-year-old medical school dropout, lives with her parents and works at a coffee shop. Years earlier, her classmate, Al Monroe, raped her best friend, Nina Fisher, who attended the same school, which led to Nina's suicide. There was no investigation by the school or consequences from the legal system. Now, Cassie spends her nights feigning drunkenness in clubs and bars, allowing men to take her to their homes and revealing her sobriety if they try to take advantage of her.

Cassie goes on a date with another former classmate, Ryan Cooper, who mentions Al is getting married. She begins a plan to exact revenge on Al and others who are suspected of being involved with the rape. She meets another former classmate and friend, Madison McPhee, who continues to deny Nina was raped. Cassie gets Madison drunk and hires a man to take Madison to a hotel room. With no memory of what happened, Madison leaves several distraught voicemails for Cassie, who does not answer them.

Cassie next targets Elizabeth Walker, the medical school dean who dismissed Nina's case for "lack of evidence". Cassie lures her teenage daughter, Amber, into her car by posing as a makeup artist for a popular band. Later, she meets Walker under the pretence of resuming her education and questions her about Nina's case. When Walker explains away her actions, Cassie tells her she dropped Amber off at a dorm room with drunk male students. A terrified Walker apologizes for her inaction, and Cassie reveals Amber is safe at a diner.

Cassie forgets to meet Ryan for a date, disappointing him. That night, Cassie again lures a man into taking her home. As they are walking out of the bar, they run into Ryan, who, not knowing what is truly happening, is hurt. Cassie visits Jordan Green, Al's lawyer, who harassed Nina into dropping charges. Green is remorseful, on leave from practicing law after a nervous breakdown, and Cassie forgives him. After visiting Nina's mother, who urges her to move on, Cassie abandons her revenge plans. She also apologizes to Ryan, and they fall in love.

Madison confronts Cassie outside her house, desperate to know what happened after their lunch. Cassie reassures her that nothing happened. Madison gives her an old phone containing a video of Nina's rape before warning her never to contact her again. Watching it, Cassie sees Ryan as a bystander. She confronts him and threatens to release the video unless he tells her where Al's bachelor party is being held. Ryan tells her and disingenuously asks for forgiveness while shrugging off his own culpability. 

Cassie arrives at Al's bachelor party posing as a stripper. She drugs Al's friends and takes Al upstairs. She handcuffs him to a bed and eventually reveals her identity. As she starts carving "Nina" onto Al's abdomen, he breaks free and suffocates her with a pillow. The next morning, Al's best friend, Joe, helps him burn Cassie's body. Her parents file a missing person report and the police begin to investigate. Ryan tells them Cassie was mentally disturbed and does not tell them she was going to the bachelor party.

At Al's wedding, Ryan receives several scheduled texts from Cassie. Green is shown receiving a package from Cassie with the phone with the video of Nina's rape and instructions to follow if she does not return from the bachelor party. Gail, Cassie's manager and friend, finds a half heart-shaped necklace with Cassie's name under the cash register; Cassie was wearing the matching half with Nina's name when she was killed. The police discover her burnt remains and the necklace and arrest Al for the murder during his wedding reception as Ryan receives a final text from Cassie, signed with her and Nina's names.

Cast

Production

Emerald Fennell devised the concept of the film in 2017, and sold the script to Margot Robbie's production company LuckyChap Entertainment after pitching the opening scene. In January 2019, it was announced Carey Mulligan had been set to star in the film, with Fennell directing. In March 2019, Bo Burnham, Alison Brie, Connie Britton, Adam Brody, Jennifer Coolidge, Laverne Cox, Max Greenfield, Christopher Mintz-Plasse, Sam Richardson, and Molly Shannon joined the cast, with Angela Zhou and Clancy Brown being added in April. Principal photography began in Los Angeles on March 26, 2019, lasting 23 days. The majority of exterior shots were filmed at Campus South, part of the Lanterman property at Cal Poly Pomona.

According to Carrie Wittmer of The Ringer, the film production crew deliberately chose male actors who previously played characters known as good or wholesome to reinforce the idea that predators can be anyone.

Fennell created "mood boards" to illustrate to the crew how Cassie has wildly different facets of her personality.

Originally, Fennell planned to end the film at the time Cassie's body was burned, but the production's financiers balked at having a negative ending. She also considered an ending where Cassie appears at the wedding and kills the men responsible but deemed it unrealistic. She decided to have the ending where Cassie has a backup revenge plan as she felt Cassie would be thorough in her planning and she would be aware she could die. Additionally, Fennell stated that having Al apprehended at his wedding would reflect Cassie's sense of humor.

The production had a budget around ~$10 million.

Music

Release
In February 2019, Focus Features acquired distribution rights to the film. It had its world premiere at the Sundance Film Festival on January 25, 2020. It was initially scheduled to be released theatrically on April 17, 2020, but was pulled from the schedule due to the initial closures of movie theaters that occurred during the COVID-19 pandemic. It was theatrically released on December 25, 2020, instead, and on video on demand on January 15, 2021. The Blu-ray was released on March 16, 2021.

Reception

Box office 
Promising Young Woman grossed $6.5 million in the United States and Canada, and $12.4 million in other territories, for a worldwide total of $18.9 million.

In North America, the film was released alongside Wonder Woman 1984, News of the World, and Pinocchio, and was projected to gross around $2 million in its opening weekend. It went on to debut to $719,305, finishing fifth at the box office. Some 63% of the audience were female, and 74% were aged over 25. The film dropped 4.4% in its second weekend to $687,900, then made $586,285 in its third weekend, finishing sixth both times. The film continued to hold well in the subsequent weekends, including seeing a 16% bump following its four Golden Globe nominations, with a running total of $5.1 million by February 21.

Critical response

Promising Young Woman received critical acclaim.  

Kate Erbland of IndieWire gave the film a "B+" and wrote "Emerald Fennell's raucous debut, Promising Young Woman, twists its buzzword-laden, spoiler-free synopsis—it's a #MeToo rape revenge thriller with bite!—into something fresh and totally wild." Writing for the Los Angeles Times, Justin Chang said "The grimly multitasking finale of Promising Young Woman feels both audacious and uncertain of itself, as Fennell tries to meld a cackle of delight and a blast of fury, with a lingering residue of anguish. It doesn't all come together, though there's an undeniable thrill in seeing it come apart." Linda Holmes of NPR wrote that while Cassie is the film's focus, "Fennell is saying something here, too, about men. About nice men and about men who think they're nice men, or nice enough men."

In Variety, Dennis Harvey praised Mulligan's performance as "skillful, entertaining and challenging", but questioned her casting, writing that she wore her "pickup-bait gear like bad drag; even her long blonde hair seems a put-on". He speculated that producer Margot Robbie may have once been intended for the role instead. Mulligan criticized the comment, saying, "I felt like it was basically saying that I wasn't hot enough to pull off this kind of ruse ... For this film, you're going to write something that is so transparent? Now? In 2020? I just couldn't believe it." Variety issued an apology, saying the review had been insensitive and "minimized" her "daring performance". The National Society of Film Critics defended Harvey's review and criticized Variety'''s apology. Harvey responded to Mulligan's comments in The Guardian: "I did not say or even mean to imply Mulligan is 'not hot enough' for the role.'" He pointed out that he was a 60-year-old gay man and did not "go around dwelling on the comparative hotnesses of young actresses".

Aisha Harris of NPR stated that Cassie does not get satisfaction from her acts of revenge, something differing from characters in other thrillers where characters take revenge. A. A. Dowd of The A.V. Club stated that Ryan Cooper initially is contrasted with predatory men and "represents the possibility of forgiveness, a light at the end of the dark tunnel [Cassie has] been traveling through since college." In regards to why Ryan chooses to cover for his friends when the police interview him, Fennell said: "He so wants to be good. But he’s not going to blow up his own life." In regards to the reveal showing his true character, Dowd said: "Even those who didn’t participate are complicit for their silence, their justifications, their refusal to intervene." Dowd added that the casting of Burnham, who "comes across as nonthreatening" and has "a boyish quality," assisted the use of the character. Harris stated that Christopher Mintz-Plasse's portrayal of Neil had "just the right amount of creepy, entitled energy."

AccoladesPromising Young Woman'' was nominated for five categories at the 93rd Academy Awards and won Best Original Screenplay. This film was longlisted in 13 categories at the 74th British Academy Film Awards, including Best Director for Fennell, Best Actress for Mulligan, and Best Supporting Actor for Burnham. It was finalised at six categories and won two awards, for Best Original Screenplay and Outstanding British Film. It was nominated for four categories at the 78th Golden Globe Awards, and six at the 26th Critics' Choice Awards. It won Best Actress for Mulligan and Best Original Screenplay for Fennell. It further received a Screen Actors Guild Awards nomination, and four AACTA Awards nomination, winning Best International Film and Best International Actress for Mulligan. Most of the awards were directed to Mulligan and Fennell, for the performances, screenplay as well as direction, respectively.

See also
 Separatist feminism
 Shakespearean tragedy

Notes

References

Further reading
  (PDF of the script)

External links

 
 
 
 

2020 films
2020 black comedy films
2020 directorial debut films
2020 independent films
2020s crime films
2020 comedy-drama films
2020 thriller films
2020s American films
2020s British films
2020s comedy thriller films
2020s English-language films
2020s feminist films
2020s vigilante films
American black comedy films
American comedy thriller films
American feminist comedy films
American rape and revenge films
British black comedy films
British comedy thriller films
British feminist films
British rape and revenge films
FilmNation Entertainment films
Films postponed due to the COVID-19 pandemic
Films produced by Margot Robbie
Films produced by Tom Ackerley
Films set in Ohio
Films shot in Los Angeles
Films whose writer won the Best Original Screenplay Academy Award
Focus Features films
LuckyChap Entertainment films